Nakano is a Japanese surname. Notable people with the surname include:

, Japanese ballerina
, Japanese swimmer
 Daisuke Nakano, Japanese gymnast
 Eiji Nakano, film actor (1904–1990)
Emiko Nakano (1925–1990), American abstract expressionist painter and printmaker, fashion Illustrator 
 George Nakano, retired American politician
, Japanese Nordic combined skier
 Hidemitsu Nakano, army general (1890–1982)
 Hiroko Nakano, Japanese politician
 Hiroyuki Nakano, film director
 Junya Nakano, video game composer
 Kansei Nakano, Japanese politician
, Japanese footballer
, Japanese footballer
 Keiko Nakano, golfer and former professional wrestler as Bull Nakano
 Koichi Nakano, retired cyclist
Koji Nakano (disambiguation), multiple people
 Kiyoshi Nakano, Japanese politician
 Kumiko Nakano, actress
, Japanese long-distance runner
 Mari Nakano, Japanese member of the World Scout Committee
 Masashi Nakano, Japanese politician
 Midori Nakano, magazine columnist
, Japanese ice hockey player
 Ryotaro Nakano (born 1988), Japanese footballer
 Ryuen Nakano, the pen name of Shizuki Tadao (1760-1806), Japanese astronomer and translator
, Japanese swimmer
 Seigō Nakano, fascist politician (1886–1943)
 Shinji Nakano, auto racer
, Japanese rugby union player
 Shinya Nakano, retired motorcycle racer
 Syuichi Nakano, astronomer
, Japanese musician
 Nakano Takeko, female warrior (1847–1868)
 Teruyoshi Nakano, special effects director
 Tsutomu Nakano, retired freestyle swimmer
, Japanese footballer
 Yoshio Nakano, professional poker player
 Yukari Nakano, retired figure skater

Fictional characters
 Azusa "Azu-nyan" Nakano, a character in the anime/manga series K-On!
 Hiroshi Nakano, a character in the anime/manga series Gravitation

 Any of the 5 following quintuplets in the anime/manga series The Quintessential Quintuplets, their dad Maruo Nakano or their mom Rena Nakano:
 Ichika Nakano
 Miku Nakano
 Nino Nakano
 Yotsuba Nakano
 Itsuki Nakano

Japanese-language surnames